"Please Help the Cause Against Loneliness" is a song by British singer Sandie Shaw and the first single from her 1988 album Hello Angel. Having released a string of hit singles in the 1960s, Shaw had semi-retired from public life in the early 1970s and had released only a few records with minimal publicity since.

"Please Help the Cause Against Loneliness" was the first single to be released from the album, and was written by Morrissey and producer Stephen Street. Morrissey also recorded a demo for his first original album, which was not officially released until the 2010 expanded reissue of Morrissey's Bona Drag.

Shaw has stated that this is one of her favourite songs.

References

1988 singles
1988 songs
Sandie Shaw songs
Songs written by Morrissey
Songs written by Stephen Street
Song recordings produced by Stephen Street
Rough Trade Records singles